Virginia Warwick (born in 1903) was an actress in silent films. She had several starring roles including in Ace of Cactus Range (1924).

Biography
Warwick's early education came in her birthplace of St. Louis; her later schooling came in Los Angeles.

A high school athlete, she became one of Mack Sennett's bathing beauties. After being a Sennett Bathing Beauty, Warwick starred opposite Frank Merrill in Reckless Speed (1925) and A Gentleman Roughneck.

Several of her films have been republished since 2000 and are held at libraries. 

In October 1924, Warwick married actor and comedian Jimmie Adams. In 1923, Warwick sued to enjoin Virginia Helen Warrick from using Virginia Warrick as a professional name.

Partial filmography
The Four Horsemen of the Apocalypse (1921) as Chichí
 Hands Off! (1921)
 Boomerang Justice (1922)
 Pioneer's Gold (1924)
 Reckless Speed (1924)
 South of the Equator (1924)
The Vagabond Trail (1924) as Nellie Le Brun
The Danger Rider  (1924)
Ace of Cactus Range (1924)
Wild West (1925) as Elsie Withers
 A Gentleman Roughneck (1925)
The Desperate Game (1926) as Belle Deane
My Own Pal (1926) as Molly
Moran of the Mounted (1926) with Reed Howes

References

External links

American silent film actresses
20th-century American actresses
Western (genre) film actresses
1903 births
Year of death missing